V520 Carinae is a single star in the southern constellation of Carina. It has the Bayer designation w Carinae, while V520 Carinae is a variable star designation. The star has an orange hue and is faintly visible to the naked eye with an apparent visual magnitude that fluctuates around +4.58. It is located at a distance of approximately 1,140 light years from the Sun based on parallax, and it is drifting further away with a radial velocity of +9 km/s. It is a candidate member of the IC 2391 moving group of co-moving stars.

This is an aging giant star with a stellar classification of K4III, although Humphreys (1970) found a supergiant class of K3Ib. It is a suspected slow irregular variable of type Lc and its brightness varies from magnitude +4.50 to +4.59 with no periodicity. The star now has 131 times the girth of the Sun, having exhausted the supply of hydrogen at its core then cooled and expanded. The star is radiating 3,600 times the luminosity of the Sun from its enlarged photosphere at an effective temperature of 3,903 K.

References

K-type giants
Slow irregular variables
Carina (constellation)
Carinae, w
Durchmusterung objects
093070
052468
4200
Carinae, V520